John Macco (born September 23, 1958) is an American businessman and politician. A member of the Republican Party, he has represented the  88th district in the Wisconsin State Assembly since 2015.

Early life and career 
Macco was born in Green Bay, Wisconsin and graduated from Green Bay Southwest High School. He helped found and served as president of Macco's Floor Cover Centers, a retail and commercial flooring company with six locations in Wisconsin. Subsequently, he founded and served as president of Macco Financial Group, a financial advisory firm serving 15 states.

Political career 
On November 4, 2014, Macco was elected to the Wisconsin State Assembly, defeating Democratic challenger Dan Robinson. Macco was reelected in the 2016 election, defeating challenger Noah Reif. He retained his seat by defeating Tom Sieber in the 2018 election. In the 2020 election, he defeated Kristin Lyerly.

In September 2021, Macco filed paperwork for a possible run for governor in the 2022 Wisconsin gubernatorial election. However, in November 2021, Macco indicated that he would not seek the Republican nomination, and that he would endorse Rebecca Kleefisch, who served as lieutenant governor from 2011 to 2019.

Personal life 
Macco has two sons. Macco's wife Suzan died from complications from breast cancer in April 2021.

References

Living people
Politicians from Green Bay, Wisconsin
Businesspeople from Wisconsin
1958 births
21st-century American politicians
Republican Party members of the Wisconsin State Assembly